Club Deportivo Cruz Azul Hidalgo, also known as Cruz Azul Hidalgo, was a professional football club in Mexico who last played in the Liga Premier league of Mexico. Their stadium was the Estadio 10 de Diciembre located in Ciudad Cooperativa Cruz Azul (previously the name of the town was Jasso) in Hidalgo and was the affiliate team of Cruz Azul. The team dissolved in 2014 after Zacatepec 1948 bought their spot to remain in Ascenso MX. But has a team in the Liga Premier de Ascenso, replace Cruz Azul Jasso.

History

Early times
The team began its professional activity in the Tercera División, in 1990 it achieved the runner-up in the category and managed to be promoted to Second Division "B". In 1994 the team won its promotion to the Segunda Division 'A', however, that year a remodeling of Mexican football was presented with the creation of the Primera División 'A', so Cruz Azul Hidalgo was invited to the new Segunda División, which became the third tier of the Mexican league system. In the first season in the Second Division, Cruz Azul Hidalgo won the championship of the season and the promotion to Primera 'A' after defeating Bachilleres.

Ascenso MX
In the Verano 1999 and Verano 2000 tournaments of the Primera División A, the club finished as runner-up in the league, being defeated by Unión de Curtidores and Irapuato respectively.

In 2003 the team was moved to Oaxaca City and renamed Cruz Azul Oaxaca, in this location the team was runner-up in the 2005 Apertura Tournament, being defeated by Puebla, in 2006 the team returned to the State of Hidalgo. In 2006, the Cruz Azul Jasso club was created as the institution's third team, participating in the Segunda División. 

After 2006 the team consolidated itself in the league, qualifying for the play–offs on a regular basis, and continuing its participation even when the league eliminated the reserve teams from Liga MX. As of 2012 the team began to have problems in the relegation table, ensuring its permanence in the final part of the seasons. 

In 2014 the team was bought by the owners of Zacatepec 1948, who used the franchise to give continuity to their team in the Ascenso MX.

Liga Premier de México
After the sale of the Cruz Azul Hidalgo franchise to Zacatepec, the Cruz Azul Jasso, which played in the Liga Premier de Ascenso, was renamed Cruz Azul Hidalgo to ensure the team's permanence in a category below the one it was active in until that year. The club was runner-up in the division in the Clausura 2015 and 2020–21 tournaments. 

At the end of 2020, Cruz Azul had changes in its board of directors, so an austerity policy was initiated with the aim of eliminating the club's debts, for this reason, the continuity of the Cruz Azul Hidalgo team began to be questioned, on June 26, 2021 it was announced that the team would be put on hiatus for the 2021–22 season.

Stadium
The Estadio 10 de Diciembre was created for Cruz Azul until they moved to Mexico City leaving it without a team. Cruz Azul Jasso then started playing there. The stadium can hold 17,000 comfortably and the stands offer some good shade.

Current squad

Club Honours

Segunda División: (2)
 1994–95
 Clausura 2007

Copa de la Liga Premier de Ascenso: (1)
 Apertura 2013

References

External links
Current Players 
"Exclusiva: Cruz Azul Hidalgo Desaparece Para Convertirse En Zacatepec." Goal.com. Goal, 15 May 2014. Web. 15 May 2014.

Football clubs in Hidalgo (state)
Hid
1993 establishments in Mexico